Shpëtim Hasani (born 10 August 1982) is a Kosovar footballer who plays for Mariebergs IK as a striker.

Club career
He began his professional career in 2000 with Süper Lig side Bursaspor, where he made no single appearance and had loan at KF Drita of the Superleague. In 2004 he signed Sakaryaspor, where he spent the next season and made his Süper Lig debut. After a short spell with KF Drita in 2005 he moved to Sweden, where he played for Kalmar FF, Degerfors IF, IK Sirius, IFK Norrköping, Örebro SK, GIF Sundsvall, Nora BK and Karlslunds IF HFK. During 2014-15 season Hasani played for Górnik Łęczna, making 29 league appearances and scoring 5 goals in the Ekstraklasa.

International career
Hasani earned his first cap for Kosovo on 5 March 2014, in the 0–0 draw against Haiti, which was the first international match involving the Kosovar national football team to be recognised by FIFA. Between 2014 and 2015 he was capped 4 times.

Honours
KF Drita
 Superleague: 2002–03

References

External links
 
 
 
 Shpetim Hasani at Fotbolltransfers.com 
 

1982 births
Living people
People from Gjilan
Kosovo Albanians
Association football forwards
Kosovan footballers
Kosovo international footballers
Bursaspor footballers
Sakaryaspor footballers
FC Drita players
Kalmar FF players
Degerfors IF players
IK Sirius Fotboll players
IFK Norrköping players
Örebro SK players
Górnik Łęczna players
GIF Sundsvall players
Football Superleague of Kosovo players
Süper Lig players
Allsvenskan players
Superettan players
Ettan Fotboll players
Division 2 (Swedish football) players
Ekstraklasa players
Expatriate footballers in Poland
Expatriate footballers in Sweden
Expatriate footballers in Turkey
Kosovan expatriate sportspeople in Poland
Kosovan expatriate sportspeople in Sweden
Kosovan expatriate sportspeople in Turkey